The following highways are numbered 146:

Brazil
 BR-146

Canada
 Prince Edward Island Route 146

Costa Rica
 National Route 146

India
 National Highway 146 (India)

Japan
 Japan National Route 146
 Fukuoka Prefectural Route 146
 Nara Prefectural Route 146

Malaysia
 Malaysia Federal Route 146

United States
 Alabama State Route 146
 Arkansas Highway 146
 California State Route 146
 Connecticut Route 146
 Florida State Road 146 (former)
 County Road 146 (Hamilton County, Florida)
 County Road 146 (Jefferson County, Florida)
 County Road 146 (Leon County, Florida)
 County Road 146 (Madison County, Florida)
 Georgia State Route 146
 Illinois Route 146
 Indiana State Road 146 (former)
 Iowa Highway 146
 K-146 (Kansas highway)
 Kentucky Route 146
 Louisiana Highway 146
 Maine State Route 146
 Maryland Route 146
 Massachusetts Route 146
 M-146 (Michigan highway) (former)
 Missouri Route 146
 Nevada State Route 146
 New Mexico State Road 146
 New York State Route 146
 County Route 146 (Cayuga County, New York)
 County Route 146 (Onondaga County, New York)
 County Route 146 (Seneca County, New York)
 North Carolina Highway 146
 Ohio State Route 146
 Oklahoma State Highway 146
 Pennsylvania Route 146
 Rhode Island Route 146
 South Carolina Highway 146
 Tennessee State Route 146 
 Texas State Highway 146
 Texas State Highway Loop 146 (former)
 Texas State Highway Spur 146
 Farm to Market Road 146
 Utah State Route 146 (1933–2014) (former)
 Virginia State Route 146
 Virginia State Route 146 (1933-1949) (former)
 Wisconsin Highway 146

Territories
 Puerto Rico Highway 146

See also
List of highways numbered 146A